The Centennial School District is a public school district serving the Borough of Ivyland, Upper Southampton Township, and Warminster Township in Bucks County, Pennsylvania.  The district operates one High School, two Middle Schools, three Elementary Schools and one Alternative School.

Elementary schools 
 William W.H. Davis Elementary School
 Everett A. McDonald Elementary School
 Willow Dale Elementary school

Middle schools 

 Log College Middle School
 Eugene Klinger Middle School

High schools 

William Tennent High School

Alternative School 

 Dorothy Henry Satellite School (closed)

Closed Schools 
 Warminster Elementary
 Lacey Park Elementary
 Johnsville Elementary
 Joseph Hart Elementary (1962 - 1988)
 William Tennent Intermediate High School
 Shelmire Elementary (aka Upper Southampton - Warminster High School)
 Fred J Stackpole Elementary (1965 - 2012)
 Alta S Leary Elementary
 Longstreth Elementary
 Middle Earth (Alternative)

Other facilities 
 Administration building - 48 Swan Way, Warminster PA 18974
 Transportation and Support Services - 305 West Street Road, Warminster PA 18974
 Planetarium - has been relocated from McDonal Elementary School to William Tennent High School.

External links 
 

School districts in Bucks County, Pennsylvania